HC Fribourg-Gottéron is a professional ice hockey team based in Fribourg, Switzerland, which competes in the National League (NL). The team is the sixth most attended team in Switzerland for the 2015–16 season with 6,156 spectators.

History
The club was originally started as HC Gottéron by the citizens of the town of Auge in 1938. They competed on an outdoor rink, most notably at Les Augustins, until 1982 when Patinoire St-Léonard was constructed.

In 1980, the name HC Fribourg-Gottéron was adopted upon promotion into the National League (NL). In spite of the club's financial struggles for the better part of their existence in the NL, they managed to reach the league's championship finals three years in a row (1992–94), but have never won a championship in their long history.

The team was saved from bankruptcy in 2006.

Honors

Champions
The team has never won a NL Championship .

Runner-up
National League (5): 1983, 1992, 1993, 1994, 2013

Players

Current roster

References

External links
  

Fribourg
Ice hockey clubs established in 1937
Ice hockey teams in Switzerland
1937 establishments in Switzerland